Argomaniz is a village in Álava, in the municipality of Elburgo, Basque Country, Spain. In 2009 it had a population of 149 inhabitants (INE).

Places of interest
The town has the National Tourism Parador of Argomaniz, established in 1978, located in the seventeenth century Renaissance palace, the Larrea palace, where Napoleon rested prior to the assault on Vitoria.

References

Populated places in Álava